Fearless class may refer to:

See also